Matti Semi (born 26 January 1957) is a Finnish politician and member of Finnish Parliament, representing the Left Alliance. He was elected to parliament in the 2015 parliamentary election with 2140 votes. Semi was born in Varkaus, where he has been a member of the City Council of Varkaus since 1993. Prior to becoming a politician, Semi was a construction worker and a boxer. In 1978 and 1979 he received the bronze medal in the Finnish boxing championships in the 71 kg class.

References

1957 births
Living people
People from Varkaus
Left Alliance (Finland) politicians
Members of the Parliament of Finland (2015–19)
Members of the Parliament of Finland (2019–23)